The Markham Building is a building in Johannesburg, South Africa,  which when completed in 1897 was the tallest building in the city. The six story building has a clock tower housing a large clock imported from Scotland with four faces North, South, East and West.  Known as Markham's Folly, because it stood out clearly in the centre of Johannesburg. In the clock tower there was an artist studio. The building was saved from demolition in 1978

History
Built in the late Victorian style of architecture the building was owned by Henry William Markham who arrived in Cape Town from England in 1873 . He set up a successful outfitter's business and in 1895 he then decided to open a branch in Johannesburg. After Henry's death his son in law took over the business.

Architecture
The Markhams Building was designed by George Ransome, a Cape Town architect who had previously designed the Cape Town Markhams store. The building features a Second Empire style roof, quite unique in Johannesburg. The plate steeply slanted plate metal roofing and porthole windows give the building a Parisian feel.

References

Buildings and structures in Johannesburg
Heritage Buildings in Johannesburg